Sodium bicarbonate (IUPAC name: sodium hydrogencarbonate), commonly known as baking soda or bicarbonate of soda, is a chemical compound with the formula NaHCO3. It is a salt composed of a sodium cation (Na+) and a bicarbonate anion (HCO3−). Sodium bicarbonate is a white solid that is crystalline, but often appears as a fine powder. It has a slightly salty, alkaline taste resembling that of washing soda (sodium carbonate). The natural mineral form is nahcolite. It is a component of the mineral natron and is found dissolved in many mineral springs.

Nomenclature 
Because it has long been known and widely used, the salt has many different names such as baking soda, bread soda, cooking soda, and bicarbonate of soda and can often be found near baking powder in stores. The term baking soda is more common in the United States, while bicarbonate of soda is more common in Australia, United Kingdom and Ireland. Abbreviated colloquial forms such as sodium bicarb, bicarb soda, bicarbonate, and bicarb are common.

The word saleratus, from Latin sal æratus (meaning "aerated salt"), was widely used in the 19th century for both sodium bicarbonate and potassium bicarbonate.

Its E number food additive code is E500.

The prefix bi in bicarbonate comes from an outdated naming system predating molecular knowledge in reference to the two molar equivalents of carbon dioxide (known as carbonic acid in the ancient chemistry language) that potassium hydrocarbonate/bicarbonate releases upon decomposition to (di)potassium carbonate and to potassium oxide (potash). The modern chemical formulas of these compounds now express their precise chemical compositions which were unknown when the name bi-carbonate of potash was coined (see also: bicarbonate).

Uses

Cooking

Leavening 

In cooking, baking soda is primarily used in baking as a leavening agent. When it reacts with acid, carbon dioxide is released, which causes expansion of the batter and forms the characteristic texture and grain in cakes, quick breads, soda bread, and other baked and fried foods. The acid–base reaction can be generically represented as follows:

NaHCO3  +  H+   →   Na+  +  CO2  +  H2O

Acidic materials that induce this reaction include hydrogen phosphates, cream of tartar, lemon juice, yogurt, buttermilk, cocoa, and vinegar. Baking soda may be used together with sourdough, which is acidic, making a lighter product with a less acidic taste.

Heat can also by itself cause sodium bicarbonate to act as a raising agent in baking because of thermal decomposition, releasing carbon dioxide at temperatures above , as follows:

 2 NaHCO3 → Na2CO3 + H2O + CO2

When used this way on its own, without the presence of an acidic component (whether in the batter or by the use of a baking powder containing acid), only half the available CO2 is released (one CO2 molecule is formed for every two equivalents of NaHCO3). Additionally, in the absence of acid, thermal decomposition of sodium bicarbonate also produces sodium carbonate, which is strongly alkaline and gives the baked product a bitter, "soapy" taste and a yellow color. Since the reaction occurs slowly at room temperature, mixtures (cake batter, etc.) can be allowed to stand without rising until they are heated in the oven.

Baking powder 

Baking powder, also sold for cooking, contains around 30% of bicarbonate, and various acidic ingredients which are activated by the addition of water, without the need for additional acids in the cooking medium. Many forms of baking powder contain sodium bicarbonate combined with calcium acid phosphate, sodium aluminium phosphate, or cream of tartar. Baking soda is alkaline; the acid used in baking powder avoids a metallic taste when the chemical change during baking creates sodium carbonate.

Pyrotechnics
Sodium bicarbonate is one of the main components of the common "black snake" firework. The effect is caused by the thermal decomposition, which produces carbon dioxide gas to produce a long snake-like ash as a combustion product of the other main component, sucrose. Sodium bicarbonate is also used to delay combustion reactions by releasing CO2 and H2O when heated, both of which are flame retardants.

Mild disinfectant
It has weak disinfectant properties, and it may be an effective fungicide against some organisms. Because baking soda will absorb musty smells, it has become a reliable method for used book sellers when making books less malodorous.

Fire extinguisher
Sodium bicarbonate can be used to extinguish small grease or electrical fires by being thrown over the fire, as heating of sodium bicarbonate releases carbon dioxide. However, it should not be applied to fires in deep fryers; the sudden release of gas may cause the grease to splatter. Sodium bicarbonate is used in BC dry chemical fire extinguishers as an alternative to the more corrosive monoammonium phosphate in ABC extinguishers. The alkaline nature of sodium bicarbonate makes it the only dry chemical agent, besides Purple-K, that was used in large-scale fire suppression systems installed in commercial kitchens. Because it can act as an alkali, the agent has a mild saponification effect on hot grease, which forms a smothering, soapy foam.

Neutralization of acids 
Sodium bicarbonate reacts spontaneously with acids, releasing CO2 gas as a reaction product. It is commonly used to neutralize unwanted acid solutions or acid spills in chemical laboratories. It is not appropriate to use sodium bicarbonate to neutralize base even though it is amphoteric, reacting with both acids and bases.

Agriculture
Sodium bicarbonate when applied on leaves, can prevent the growth of fungi; however, it does not kill the fungus. Excessive amount of sodium bicarbonate can cause discolouration of fruits (two percent solution) and chlorosis (one percent solution).

Medical uses and health

Sodium bicarbonate mixed with water can be used as an antacid to treat acid indigestion and heartburn. Its reaction with stomach acid produces salt, water, and carbon dioxide:
NaHCO3 + HCl → NaCl + H2O + CO2(g)

A mixture of sodium bicarbonate and polyethylene glycol such as PegLyte, dissolved in water and taken orally, is an effective gastrointestinal lavage preparation and laxative prior to gastrointestinal surgery, gastroscopy, etc.

Intravenous sodium bicarbonate in an aqueous solution is sometimes used for cases of acidosis, or when insufficient sodium or bicarbonate ions are in the blood. In cases of respiratory acidosis, the infused bicarbonate ion drives the carbonic acid/bicarbonate buffer of plasma to the left, and thus raises the pH. For this reason, sodium bicarbonate is used in medically supervised cardiopulmonary resuscitation. Infusion of bicarbonate is indicated only when the blood pH is markedly low (< 7.1–7.0).

HCO3− is used for treatment of hyperkalemia, as it will drive K+ back into cells during periods of acidosis. Since sodium bicarbonate can cause alkalosis, it is sometimes used to treat aspirin overdoses. Aspirin requires an acidic environment for proper absorption, and a basic environment will diminish aspirin absorption in cases of overdose. Sodium bicarbonate has also been used in the treatment of tricyclic antidepressant overdose. It can also be applied topically as a paste, with three parts baking soda to one part water, to relieve some kinds of insect bites and stings (as well as accompanying swelling).

Some alternative practitioners, such as Tullio Simoncini, have promoted baking soda as a cancer cure, which the American Cancer Society has warned against due to both its unproven effectiveness and potential danger in use. Edzard Ernst has called the promotion of sodium bicarbonate as a cancer cure "one of the more sickening alternative cancer scams I have seen for a long time".

Sodium bicarbonate can be added to local anesthetics, to speed up the onset of their effects and make their injection less painful. It is also a component of Moffett's solution, used in nasal surgery.

It has been proposed that acidic diets weaken bones. One systematic meta-analysis of the research shows no such effect. Another also finds that there is no evidence that alkaline diets improve bone health, but suggests that there "may be some value" to alkaline diets for other reasons.

Antacid (such as baking soda) solutions have been prepared and used by protesters to alleviate the effects of exposure to tear gas during protests.

Similarly to its use in baking, sodium bicarbonate is used together with a mild acid such as tartaric acid as the excipient in effervescent tablets: when such a tablet is dropped in a glass of water, the carbonate leaves the reaction medium as carbon dioxide gas (HCO3− + H+ → H2O + CO2↑ or, more precisely, HCO3− + H3O+ → 2 H2O + CO2↑). This makes the tablet disintegrate, leaving the medication suspended and/or dissolved in the water together with the resulting salt (in this example, sodium tartrate).

Personal hygiene
Sodium bicarbonate is also used as an ingredient in some mouthwashes. It has anticaries and abrasive properties. It works as a mechanical cleanser on the teeth and gums, neutralizes the production of acid in the mouth, and also acts as an antiseptic to help prevent infections. Sodium bicarbonate in combination with other ingredients can be used to make a dry or wet deodorant. Sodium bicarbonate may be used as a buffering agent, combined with table salt, when creating a solution for nasal irrigation.

It is used in eye hygiene to treat blepharitis. This is done by addition of a teaspoon of sodium bicarbonate to cool water that was recently boiled, followed by gentle scrubbing of the eyelash base with a cotton swab dipped in the solution.

Veterinary uses
Sodium bicarbonate is used as a cattle feed supplement, in particular as a buffering agent for the rumen.

Cleaning agent
Sodium bicarbonate is used in a process for removing paint and corrosion called sodablasting. As a blasting medium, sodium bicarbonate is used to remove surface contamination from softer and less resilient substrates such as aluminium, copper or timber which could be damaged by silica sand abrasive media.

A manufacturer recommends a paste made from baking soda with minimal water as a gentle scouring powder, and is useful in removing surface rust, as the rust forms a water-soluble compound when in a concentrated alkaline solution; cold water should be used, as hot-water solutions can corrode steel. Sodium bicarbonate attacks the thin protective oxide layer that forms on aluminium, making it unsuitable for cleaning this metal. A solution in warm water will remove the tarnish from silver when the silver is in contact with a piece of aluminium foil. Baking soda is commonly added to washing machines as a replacement for water softener and to remove odors from clothes. It is also almost as effective in removing heavy tea and coffee stains from cups as sodium hydroxide, when diluted with warm water.

During the Manhattan Project to develop the nuclear bomb in the early 1940s, the chemical toxicity of uranium was an issue. Uranium oxides were found to stick very well to cotton cloth, and did not wash out with soap or laundry detergent. However, the uranium would wash out with a 2% solution of sodium bicarbonate. Clothing can become contaminated with toxic dust of depleted uranium (DU), which is very dense, hence used for counterweights in a civilian context, and in armour-piercing projectiles. DU is not removed by normal laundering; washing with about 6 ounces (170 g) of baking soda in 2 gallons (7.5 L) of water will help to wash it out.

Odor control

It is often claimed that baking soda is an effective odor remover, and it is often recommended that an open box be kept in the refrigerator to absorb odor. This idea was promoted by the leading U.S. brand of baking soda, Arm & Hammer, in an advertising campaign starting in 1972. Though this campaign is considered a classic of marketing, leading within a year to more than half of American refrigerators containing a box of baking soda, there is little evidence that it is in fact effective in this application.

Hydrogen gas production

Sodium bicarbonate can be used as a catalyst in gas production. Its performance for this application is "good", however not usually used. Hydrogen gas is produced via electrolysis of water, process in which electric current is applied through a volume of water, which causes the hydrogen atoms to separate from the oxygen atoms. This demonstration is usually done in high school chemistry classes to show electrolysis.

Chemistry

Sodium bicarbonate is an amphoteric compound. Aqueous solutions are mildly alkaline due to the formation of carbonic acid and hydroxide ion:

HCO + H2O →  + OH−

Sodium bicarbonate can often be used as a safer alternative to sodium hydroxide, and as such can be used as a wash to remove any acidic impurities from a "crude" liquid, producing a purer sample. Reaction of sodium bicarbonate and an acid produces a salt and carbonic acid, which readily decomposes to carbon dioxide and water:

NaHCO3 + HCl → NaCl + H2O+CO2
H2CO3 → H2O + CO2(g)

Sodium bicarbonate reacts with acetic acid (found in vinegar), producing sodium acetate, water, and carbon dioxide:

NaHCO3 + CH3COOH → CH3COONa + H2O + CO2(g)

Sodium bicarbonate reacts with bases such as sodium hydroxide to form carbonates:

NaHCO3 + NaOH → Na2CO3 + H2O

Thermal decomposition
At temperatures from 80–100 °C (176–212 °F), sodium bicarbonate gradually decomposes into sodium carbonate, water, and carbon dioxide. The conversion is faster at :

 2 NaHCO3 → Na2CO3 + H2O + CO2

Most bicarbonates undergo this dehydration reaction. Further heating converts the carbonate into the oxide (above ):

 Na2CO3 → Na2O + CO2

These conversions are relevant to the use of NaHCO3 as a fire-suppression agent ("BC powder") in some dry-powder fire extinguishers.

Stability and shelf life
If kept cool (room temperature) and dry (an airtight container is recommended to keep out moist air), sodium bicarbonate can be kept without a significant amount of decomposition for at least two or three years.

History
The word natron has been in use in many languages throughout modern times (in the forms of anatron, natrum and natron) and originated (like Spanish, French and English natron as well as 'sodium') via Arabic naṭrūn (or anatrūn; cf. the Lower Egyptian “Natrontal” Wadi El Natrun, where a mixture of sodium carbonate and sodium hydrogen carbonate for the dehydration of mummies was used ) from Greek nítron (νίτρον) (Herodotus; Attic lítron (λίτρον)), which can be traced back to ancient Egyptian ntr.  The Greek nítron (soda, saltpeter) was also used in Latin (sal) nitrum and in German Salniter (the source of Nitrogen, Nitrat etc.).

In 1791, French chemist Nicolas Leblanc produced sodium carbonate, also known as soda ash. The pharmacist Valentin Rose the Younger is credited with the discovery of sodium bicarbonate in 1801 in Berlin. In 1846, two American bakers, John Dwight and Austin Church, established the first factory in the United States to produce baking soda from sodium carbonate and carbon dioxide.

Saleratus, potassium or sodium bicarbonate, is mentioned in the novel Captains Courageous by Rudyard Kipling as being used extensively in the 1800s in commercial fishing to prevent freshly caught fish from spoiling.

In 1919, US Senator Lee Overman declared that bicarbonate of soda could cure the Spanish flu. In the midst of the debate on 26 January 1919, he interrupted the discussion to announce the discovery of a cure. "I want to say, for the benefit of those who are making this investigation," he reported, "that I was told by a judge of a superior court in the mountain country of North Carolina they have discovered a remedy for this disease." The purported cure implied a critique of modern science and an appreciation for the simple wisdom of simple people. "They say that common baking soda will cure the disease," he continued, "that they have cured it with it, that they have no deaths up there at all; they use common baking soda, which cures the disease."

Production
Sodium bicarbonate is produced industrially from sodium carbonate:
Na2CO3 +  CO2  +  H2O  →  2 NaHCO3
It is produced on the scale of about 100,000 tonnes/year (as of 2001)  with a worldwide production capacity of 2.4 million tonnes per year (as of 2002). Commercial quantities of baking soda are also produced by a similar method: soda ash, mined in the form of the ore trona, is dissolved in water and treated with carbon dioxide. Sodium bicarbonate precipitates as a solid from this solution.

Regarding the Solvay process, sodium bicarbonate is an intermediate in the reaction of sodium chloride, ammonia, and carbon dioxide. The product however shows low purity (75pc).

 NaCl + CO2 + NH3 + H2O → NaHCO3 + NH4Cl

Although of no practical value, NaHCO3 may be obtained by the reaction of carbon dioxide with an aqueous solution of sodium hydroxide:
CO2 + NaOH → NaHCO3

Mining
Naturally occurring deposits of nahcolite (NaHCO3) are found in the Eocene-age (55.8–33.9 Mya) Green River Formation, Piceance Basin in Colorado. Nahcolite was deposited as beds during periods of high evaporation in the basin. It is commercially mined using common underground mining techniques such as bore, drum, and longwall mining in a fashion very similar to coal mining.

It is also produced by solution mining, pumping heated water through nahcolite beds and crystalizing the dissolved nahcolite through a cooling crystallization process.

In popular culture

Sodium bicarbonate, as "bicarbonate of soda", was a frequent source of punch lines for Groucho Marx in Marx Brothers movies. In Duck Soup, Marx plays the leader of a nation at war. In one scene, he receives a message from the battlefield that his general is reporting a gas attack, and Groucho tells his aide: "Tell him to take a teaspoonful of bicarbonate of soda and a half a glass of water." In A Night at the Opera, Groucho's character addresses the opening night crowd at an opera by saying of the lead tenor: "Signor Lassparri comes from a very famous family. His mother was a well-known bass singer. His father was the first man to stuff spaghetti with bicarbonate of soda, thus causing and curing indigestion at the same time."

In the Joseph L. Mankewicz classic All About Eve, the Max Fabian character (Gregory Ratoff) has an extended scene with Margo Channing (Bette Davis) in which, suffering from heartburn, he requests and then drinks bicarbonate of soda, eliciting a prominent burp. Channing promises to always keep a box of bicarb with Max's name on it.

See also 

 Carbonic acid
 List of ineffective cancer treatments
 List of minerals
 Natron
 Natrona (disambiguation)
 Trona

References

Bibliography

External links 

 International Chemical Safety Card 1044

Acid salts
Antacids
Bases (chemistry)
Bicarbonates
Chemical substances for emergency medicine
Fire suppression agents
Household chemicals
Leavening agents
Sodium compounds
E-number additives
Powders
Food powders